This is a list of Latvian football transfers in the winter transfer window 2022-23 by club. Only clubs of the 2023 Latvian Higher League are included.

Latvian Higher League

Valmiera FC

In:

Out:

Riga

In:

Out:

RFS

In:

Out:

Liepāja

In:

Out:

FK Auda

In:

Out:

FK Tukums 2000

In:

Out:

BFC Daugavpils

In:

Out:

Spartaks Jūrmala*

In:

Out:

Metta

In:

Out:

SK Super Nova

In:

Out:

Jelgava

In:

Out:

* Spartaks Jūrmala failed to obtain the necessary license for participation in the 2023 Latvian Higher League.

References

Latvia
2022-23